María Gabriela Hernández Gómez (born January 15, 1939), also known as Gaby Hernández, is a Chilean theater, film and television actress with a long active career.

Early life and education

Her father was from Castilla, Spain, and her mother of Chilean origin. She is the younger sister of Nieves Hernández and also actress Naldy Hernández.

Her childhood was in Valdivia and in her adolescence she moved to Santiago, where she graduated from secondary education at Liceo Experimental Manuel de Salas. At age 10 she entered the National Conservatory of Music, where she enhanced her skills for the piano.

She studied theater at the School of Theater of the University of Chile, where she was a generation partner of Sonia Mena, Lucy Salgado and Diana Sanz. As a student, she participated in the play La casa de Bernarda Alba from 1960, alongside actresses such as Marés González, Bélgica Castro, María Cánepa, Carmen Bunster, Claudia Paz and María Teresa Fricke.

Career

1960s
In 1962 she made her professional debut in the role of Cornelia in the first version of El abanderado by Luis Alberto Heiremans, in the Antonio Varas Room of the same university.  For a short time she worked at the company  Los mimos de Noisvander  by Enrique Noisvander. During this period, she also participated in the magazine Cine Amor, starring in several fotonovelas.

In 1964, she replaced Carmen Barros in the leading role of Carmela in the second world tour of Isidora Aguirre's La pergola de las flores, with great international success.

At the age of 24, after the tour of the play, the Spanish producer Luis de Llano Palmer offered him an exclusive contract on Televisa, settling in Mexico for five years, working on television in productions such as Rocambole and various Mexican television programs. During this period she worked in theater plays and musical shows of Cabaret, dancer of the Latin Show Ballet of Chavela Vargas. She also studied Jazz dance at the John di Martino Academy. Subsequently, she worked for two years in Washington D.C., United States.

1970s
During the 1970s, she settled in Spain performing various theater productions. There she worked in theater together with Josep Maria Pou, at the María Guerrero Theater, in productions by various renowned playwrights, with great success.

1980s
After more than 15 years away from her native country, where she developed an acting career mainly in Mexico, the United States and Spain, she returned to Chile in 1988 to vote in favor of the No campaign in the military dictatorship in the 1988 Chilean national plebiscite.

In the same year, the producer Sonia Fuchs offered her a television contract to participate in soap operas of the Dramatic Area of TVN. Her debut in telenovelas was with a supporting role in Bellas y Audaces, starring Luz Jiménez and Sonia Viveros. The following year, she participated in the biographical miniseries Teresa de los Andes directed by Vicente Sabatini in the role of Juana del Solar.

1990s
From 1990 to 2000 she actively participated in the Dramatic Area of Channel 13, standing out in ¿Te conté?, Villa Napoli, Marrón Glacé, Amor a domicilio, Fuera de control and in the series Los Carcamo.

2000s
From 2001 to 2005 she collaborated with María Eugenia Rencoret on successful TVN soap operas, such as Amores de Mercado and Purasangre.

2010s
In 2014 she left TVN to emigrate to Mega's Dramatic Area, where she participated in the television series Pituca sin lucas, where her character Lita Amunátegui obtained great success and recognition.

In 2017 she participated in the play Lady Marginal, directed by Claudia Di Girólamo, in tribute to the playwright Juan Radrigán.

In 2019, she debuted as a television host in the morning magazine Viva la pipol de Chilevisión.

Awards and recognition
In 2018, she received a tribute from the Actors Union of Chile to her career.

In 2020 she was recognized with the title of Illustrious Daughter of the city of Valdivia.

Filmography

Films

Telenovelas

TV Series

Theatre 
La casa de Bernarda Alba (1960)
El abanderado (1962) de Luis Alberto Heiremans
Árbol viejo
Goldspell
La hija del capitán
La danza macabra (1991) de August Strindberg
Rey Lear (1992) de William Shakespeare
El malentendido (1994) de Albert Camus
Madame de Sade (1997) de Yukio Mishima
Mina Antipersonal (2013) de Claudia Di Girolamo
Un jardín secreto (2016) de Jorge Díaz 
Lady Marginal (2017) de Claudia Di Girolamo
Pablo y Gabriela (2018)
Viejas de mierda (2019) junto a Gloria Benavides y Gloria Münchmeyer

References 

1939 births
Living people
Chilean film actresses
Chilean television actresses
Chilean telenovela actresses
People from Valdivia
University of Chile alumni